SV Saestum is a sports club from Zeist, Netherlands.

It is most known for its successful women's football team.

History 
The club was founded on 6 January 1926. The women's football section opened in 1981.
Since the founding of the Hoofdklasse, Saestum plays in the league, which was the highest national league in the Netherlands until the creation of the Eredivisie in 2007.
In 1996 the team won its first national championship, the first one of five championships in a row. Three more titles followed in 2002, 2005 and 2006.

The club first qualified for the UEFA Women's Cup in 2002-03, they won 2 out of 3 matches in the first qualifying round. In the 2005-06 edition they became the first Dutch team to move on to the second qualifying round, where they met the eventual finalist 1. FFC Turbine Potsdam and semi-finalist Montpelier HSC winning only 3 points. The next season they again reached the second qualifying round and only lost by goal difference to Potsdam after 2 wins and one draw. It was enough to qualify for the quarter finals, which they lost heavily to eventual losing finalist Umeå.

SV Saestum has got the highest attendance in the Hoofdklasse.

Former players

  Katoucha Patra

Honours

National
 Hoofdklasse
 Winners (9): 1996, 1997, 1998, 1999, 2000, 2002, 2005, 2006, 2008
 Dutch Cup
 Winners (4): 1997,  1998,  2004,  2009
 Dutch Cup
 Winners (3): 2004, 2005, 2006

UEFA Women's Cup

References

External links 
 Official Website

Women's football clubs in the Netherlands
Football clubs in Utrecht (province)
1926 establishments in the Netherlands
Sport in Zeist
Association football clubs established in 1926